is a railway station located in the city of  Gifu,  Gifu Prefecture,  Japan, operated by the private railway operator Meitetsu.

Lines

Station layout

Tagami Station has two ground-level opposed side platforms connected by a level crossing. The station is unattended.

Platforms

Adjacent stations

|-
!colspan=5|Nagoya Railroad

History
Tagami Station opened on January 21, 1926.

Surrounding area
Gifu Velodrome
Bairin Park

See also
 List of Railway Stations in Japan

External links

  

Railway stations in Japan opened in 1926
Stations of Nagoya Railroad
Railway stations in Gifu Prefecture